Caleb Cain Marcus is an American photographer, living in New York City.

Life and work
Cain Marcus was born in Colorado. He received his MFA from Columbia University.

The book The Silent Aftermath of Space was published in 2010. Robert Frank introduced the artist—"His view shows a quiet resignation and jubilation for being an artist and alone." The series of twenty dense black and white photographs focused on New York City. They showed spaces devoid of people in the darkness.

The book A Portrait of Ice was published in 2012. The series of thirty color images depicted glaciers from Patagonia, Iceland, Alaska, Norway and New Zealand. The photo critic Marvin Heiferman, whose essay was included in the book, introduces the work as, "eerily gorgeous… like the eccentrically rendered landforms you might soar over in a dream…"

Critic, Mark Feeney, reviewed Cain Marcus' large images for The Boston Globe. "[The work has] an inherent painterliness that would have made Caspar David Friedrich's Romantic soul swoon. Swooning is not uncalled for. These images seem to belong to their own unique medium — in the same way that this terrain and climate belong to their own unique world."

Publications 
 The Silent Aftermath of Space. Bologna, Italy: Damiani. . With a foreword by Robert Frank.
 A Portrait of Ice. Damiani, Bologna, Italy, September 2012. With text by Marvin Heiferman and Robin Bell A Portrait of Ice.

Awards
 2010: International Photography Award in the category of books
2013: William H. Eells National Colloquium Artist

Collections 
Cain Marcus' work is included in the following public collections:
Metropolitan Museum of Art, New York
Museum of Fine Arts Houston, Houston
The High Museum of Art, Atlanta
Joseph M Cohen Family Collection, New York
University of Michigan Museum of Art, Ann Arbor
Hood Museum of Art, Hanover
Delaware Art Museum, Wilmington
Samek Art Museum, Bucknell University
Mead Art Museum, Amherst College
Newcomb Art Museum, Tulane University

References

American photographers
Artists from Colorado
Living people
Year of birth missing (living people)
Columbia University School of the Arts alumni